Hasan Kohal (also Romanized as Ḩasan Kohal) is a village in Ujan-e Gharbi Rural District, in the Central District of Bostanabad County, East Azerbaijan Province, Iran. At the 2006 census, its population was 60, in 13 families.

References 

Populated places in Bostanabad County